Love In Stereo is the second studio album by American singer Rahsaan Patterson. It was released by MCA Records on October 26, 1999, in the United States. The album peaked at number 51 on the US Billboard Top R&B/Hip-Hop Albums chart. Lead single "Treat You Like a Queen" reached number 61 on the US Billboard Hot R&B/Hip-Hop Songs chart.

Critical reception

AllMusic editor Stacia Proefrock found that Love in Stereo showed that "Patterson not only overcame the sophomore slump but triumphed with a very well-crafted album that far surpasses his completely adequate first release. Slick production and strong songwriting help support Patterson's smooth, laid-back style and Stevie Wonder-like vocals [...] Patterson is not only paying homage to Wonder in approach, but also in spirit. "Sure Boy" and "The Day" are only two of several other songs on the collection that are extremely well-written with an inspirational edge. Never preachy and always stylish, on Love in Stereo Patterson has managed to make an album that should appeal to a broad range of R&B fans."

Track listing

Charts

References

External links
 Not-Of-This-World - Official website of Rahsaan Patterson
 Rahsaan Patterson's official homepage

1999 albums
Rahsaan Patterson albums
MCA Records albums
Gospel albums by American artists